Elongoparorchis is a genus of flatworms belonging to the family Dictysarcidae.

Species:

Elongoparorchis arii 
Elongoparorchis moniliovatus 
Elongoparorchis pneumatis

References

Platyhelminthes